Gyropena is a genus of two species of tiny pinwheel snails that are endemic to Australia's Lord Howe Island in the Tasman Sea.

Species
 Gyropena minuta  Shea & Griffiths, 2010 – Mount Gower pinwheel snail
 Gyropena verans  Iredale, 1944 – sunken-spired pinwheel snail

Description
The shells of these snails are 0.9–1.5 mm in height, with a diameter of 1.9–2.9 mm. The colour is golden-brown to pale fawn. The shape is discoidal with a low or sunken spire, whorls shouldered and sutures impressed, with prominent radial ribs. The umbilicus is widely open. The aperture is roundly lunate.

Habitat
These snails are found at the southern end of the island, on the summits and slopes of Mount Lidgbird and Mount Gower, in leaf litter.

References

 
 
Taxa named by Tom Iredale
Gastropod genera
Gastropods of Lord Howe Island